Three Days is the debut studio album released in 2001 by American country music artist Pat Green. It was also his major-label debut, following three self-released studio albums, two live compilations, and an independent collaborative album. Three Days produced two chart singles for Green on the Billboard country charts: "Carry On" at No. 35 and the title track at No. 36. The former was originally recorded on Green's 2000 album Carry On and was later re-recorded on his 2009 album What I'm For, while "Texas on My Mind" was previously released on the album Songs We Wish We'd Written, a collaborative album with Cory Morrow released earlier in 2001.

Track listing

Personnel
Adapted from liner notes.

Bukka Allen - accordion (tracks 2, 11), keyboards (tracks 1, 5, 9, 13)
Brendon Anthony - violin
Brett Danaher - acoustic guitar, electric guitar, baritone guitar
Will Dupuy - upright bass (track 11)
Glen Fukunaga - bass guitar (tracks 1, 5, 8-10, 13)
Pat Green - acoustic guitar, harmonica, lead vocals, background vocals
David Grissom - electric guitar (track 1)
Terri Hendrix - background vocals (track 9)
Bob Livingston - background vocals (track 13)
Lloyd Maines - acoustic guitar, electric guitar, baritone guitar, pedal steel guitar, lap steel guitar, dobro, papoose, mandolin, percussion, background vocals
Jordan McBride - bass guitar, upright bass, mandolin, background vocals
Cory Morrow - duet vocals (track 13)
Trish Murphy - background vocals (track 6)
Willie Nelson - duet vocals (track 2)
David Neuhauser - electric guitar, acoustic slide guitar, electric slide guitar, Hammond B-3 organ, Wurlitzer, background vocals
Paul Pearcy - percussion (tracks 1, 5, 8, 9)
Justin Pollard - drums, percussion
Chris Skiles - drums (tracks 1, 5)
Walt Wilkins - background vocals (tracks 3, 4, 8, 11)

Chart performance

Weekly charts

Year-end charts

References

2001 debut albums
Pat Green albums
Universal Records albums
Republic Records albums
Albums produced by Greg Ladanyi